Cartoon violence is the representation of violent actions involving animated characters and situations.

Cartoon violence may also refer to:

 Cartoon Violence (album), a 2012 album by the indie rock band Herzog
 a dimension of Cartoon physics
 a content descriptor used by the Entertainment Software Rating Board
 a rating category of The Independent Game Rating System
 a reaction to the Jyllands-Posten Muhammad cartoons controversy